Antoine Noël Benoît Graincourt (1748–1823) was a French painter and miniaturist. He was born in Corbie, Picardy in the Somme Valley on March 17, 1748 but moved away from his home region to Paris, where he trained under Gabriel François and Pierre Doyen and received a stipend from the Cardinal of Luynes. He painted portraits of famous French military and naval figures both contemporary and from the recent past, including René Duguay-Trouin and François Louis de Rousselet, Marquis de Châteaurenault. He died in Champeaux on December 26, 1823.

References

1748 births
1823 deaths
18th-century French painters
French male painters
19th-century French painters
French portrait painters
19th-century French male artists
18th-century French male artists